Preston Castle may refer to the following locations:
Preston Castle, Lancashire in England
Preston Castle (Ione, California), also known as the Preston School of Industry